The 1985 CFL season is considered to be the 32nd season in modern-day Canadian football, although it is officially the 28th Canadian Football League season.

CFL News in 1985
The CFL adopted a regular season overtime format that will consist of two-minute halves (no sudden death), which would be implemented for the 1986 season. In addition, the CFL changed the playoff overtime format from two ten-minute halves (with no sudden death) to two five-minute halves (no sudden death).

Regular season standings

Final regular season standings
Note: GP = Games Played, W = Wins, L = Losses, T = Ties, PF = Points For, PA = Points Against, Pts = Points

Bold text means that they have clinched the playoffs.
BC and Hamilton have first round byes.

Grey Cup playoffs

The BC Lions are the 1985 Grey Cup champions, defeating the Hamilton Tiger-Cats 37–24, at Montreal's Olympic Stadium. This was BC's first Grey Cup victory since 1964. The Lions' Roy Dewalt (QB) was named the Grey Cup's Most Valuable Player on Offence and James "Quick" Parker (DE) was named Grey Cup's Most Valuable Player on Defence, while Lui Passaglia (K/P) was named the Grey Cup's Most Valuable Canadian.

Playoff bracket

CFL Leaders
 CFL Passing Leaders
 CFL Rushing Leaders
 CFL Receiving Leaders

1985 CFL All-Stars

Offence
QB – Matt Dunigan, Edmonton Eskimos
RB – Willard Reaves, Winnipeg Blue Bombers
RB – Keyvan Jenkins, BC Lions
SB – Joe Poplawski, Winnipeg Blue Bombers
TE – Ray Elgaard, Saskatchewan Roughriders
WR – Mervyn Fernandez, BC Lions
WR – Jeff Boyd, Winnipeg Blue Bombers
C – John Bonk, Winnipeg Blue Bombers
OG – Dan Ferrone, Toronto Argonauts
OG – Nick Bastaja, Winnipeg Blue Bombers
OT – John Blain, BC Lions
OT – Chris Walby, Winnipeg Blue Bombers

Defence
DT – Mike Gray, BC Lions
DT – James Curry, Toronto Argonauts
DE – Grover Covington, Hamilton Tiger-Cats
DE – James "Quick" Parker, BC Lions
LB – Ben Zambiasi, Hamilton Tiger-Cats
LB – Tyrone Jones, Winnipeg Blue Bombers
LB – Kevin Konar, BC Lions
DB – Darnell Clash, BC Lions
DB – Less Browne, Hamilton Tiger-Cats
DB – Ken Hailey, Winnipeg Blue Bombers
DB – Howard Fields, Hamilton Tiger-Cats
DB – Paul Bennett, Hamilton Tiger-Cats

Special teams
P – Ken Clark, Ottawa Rough Riders
K – Trevor Kennerd, Winnipeg Blue Bombers

1985 Eastern All-Stars

Offence
QB – Ken Hobart, Hamilton Tiger-Cats
RB – Bob Bronk, Toronto Argonauts
RB – Lester Brown, Ottawa Rough Riders
SB – Mike McTague, Montreal Concordes
TE – Nick Arakgi, Montreal Concordes
WR – Terry Greer, Toronto Argonauts
WR – Steve Stapler, Hamilton Tiger-Cats
C – Marv Allemang, Hamilton Tiger-Cats
OG – Dan Ferrone, Toronto Argonauts
OG – Lloyd Fairbanks, Montreal Concordes
OT – Roger Cattelan, Ottawa Rough Riders
OT – Kevin Powell, Ottawa Rough Riders

Defence
DT – Doug Scott, Montreal Concordes
DT – James Curry, Toronto Argonauts
DE – Grover Covington, Hamilton Tiger-Cats
DE – Lloyd Lewis, Ottawa Rough Riders
LB – Ben Zambiasi, Hamilton Tiger-Cats
LB – Rick Sowieta, Ottawa Rough Riders
LB – William Mitchell, Toronto Argonauts
DB – Carl Brazley, Toronto Argonauts
DB – Less Browne, Hamilton Tiger-Cats
DB – Ricky Barden, Ottawa Rough Riders
DB – Howard Fields, Hamilton Tiger-Cats
DB – Paul Bennett, Hamilton Tiger-Cats

Special teams
P – Ken Clark, Ottawa Rough Riders
K – Bernie Ruoff, Hamilton Tiger-Cats

1985 Western All-Stars

Offence
QB – Matt Dunigan, Edmonton Eskimos
RB – Willard Reaves, Winnipeg Blue Bombers
RB – Keyvan Jenkins, BC Lions
SB – Joe Poplawski, Winnipeg Blue Bombers
TE – Ray Elgaard, Saskatchewan Roughriders
WR – Mervyn Fernandez, BC Lions
WR – Jeff Boyd, Winnipeg Blue Bombers
C – John Bonk, Winnipeg Blue Bombers
OG – Leo Blanchard, Edmonton Eskimos
OG – Nick Bastaja, Winnipeg Blue Bombers
OT – John Blain, BC Lions
OT – Chris Walby, Winnipeg Blue Bombers

Defence
DT – Mike Gray, BC Lions
DT – Rick Klassen, BC Lions
DE – Tony Norman, Winnipeg Blue Bombers
DE – James "Quick" Parker, BC Lions
LB – Dan Bass, Edmonton Eskimos
LB – Tyrone Jones, Winnipeg Blue Bombers
LB – Kevin Konar, BC Lions
LB – Glen Jackson, BC Lions
DB – Darnell Clash, BC Lions
DB – Dave Shaw, Winnipeg Blue Bombers
DB – Ken Hailey, Winnipeg Blue Bombers
DB – Wiley Turner, Winnipeg Blue Bombers
DB – Melvin Byrd, BC Lions
DB – Scott Flagel, Winnipeg Blue Bombers

Special teams
P – Tom Dixon, Edmonton Eskimos
K – Trevor Kennerd, Winnipeg Blue Bombers

1985 CFL Awards
CFL's Most Outstanding Player Award – Mervyn Fernandez (WR), BC Lions
CFL's Most Outstanding Canadian Award – Paul Bennett (DB), Hamilton Tiger-Cats
CFL's Most Outstanding Defensive Player Award – Tyrone Jones (LB), Winnipeg Blue Bombers
CFL's Most Outstanding Offensive Lineman Award – Nick Bastaja (OT), Winnipeg Blue Bombers
CFL's Most Outstanding Rookie Award – Mike Gray (DT), BC Lions
CFLPA's Outstanding Community Service Award – Tyrone Crews (LB), BC Lions
CFL's Coach of the Year – Don Matthews, BC Lions

References 

CFL
Canadian Football League seasons